Sohodol may refer to several places in Romania:

 Sohodol, a commune in Alba County
 Sohodol, a village in Albac Commune, Alba County
 Sohodol, a village in Măgura Commune, Bacău County
 Sohodol, a village in Căbești Commune, Bihor County
 Sohodol, a village in Bran Commune, Braşov County
 Sohodol, a village in Tismana town, Gorj County
 Sohodol (Szohodol), a village in Lelese Commune, Hunedoara County
 Sohodol (Arieș), a tributary of the Arieș in Alba County
 Sohodol (Bârsa), a tributary of the Bârsa in Brașov County 
 Sohodol, a tributary of the Călmățui in Olt County
 Sohodol, a tributary of the Nădrab in Hunedoara County
 Sohodol, a tributary of the Jiul de Vest in Hunedoara County
 Sohodol (Tismana), a tributary of the Tismana in Gorj County

The name is of Slavic origin, a compound of soh ("dry, arid") and dol ("creek, ditch, valley").

Notes

Place names of Slavic origin in Romania